Jacques Vriens (born 26 March 1946) is a Dutch children's author and playwright. He is known for his 1999 book Achtste-groepers huilen niet, which was twice adapted into a film. Vriens formerly worked as a schoolteacher and has written for the show Tien torens diep. In 2001 he was appointed to the Order of the Netherlands Lion by Queen Beatrix.

Works adapted
 Tien torens diep (Ten Towers Deep) (2004 book; 2009 television series)
 Achtste-groepers huilen niet (Eighth Graders Don't Cry, Kule Kidz Gråter Ikke, Cool Kids Don't Cry) (1999 book; 2012 film; 2014 film)
 Oorlogsgeheimen (Secrets of War) (2007 book; 2014 film)

Bibliography

Theater productions
 Grootmoeders grote oren (2008)
 De bende van de Korenwolf (2008)
 Moeders knie (2010–2012)
 Achtste-groepers huilen niet (2011–2012)
 De bende van de Korenwolf – Het geheim van de zoenende gasten (2011–2013)
 Hoe verzint- het toch allemaal? (2012)
 Oorlogsgeheimen (2013)
 De rijke bramenplukker en 3  sprookjes voor volwassenen van Godfried Bomans (2013)

References

External links

   at jacquesvriens.nl
 
 
 Jacques Vriens at Unieboekspectrum.nl 

1946 births
Living people
Dutch children's writers
People from 's-Hertogenbosch